Thandwa Moreki is a Botswana footballer who plays as a midfielder for Township Rollers F.C. He made one appearance for the Botswana national football team, a friendly against Swaziland in 2002.

References

External links

1959 births
Living people
Association football midfielders
Botswana footballers
Botswana international footballers
Gaborone United S.C. players